The 2018 Tour of Utah was a seven-stage road cycling race held from August 6 to August 12, 2018, and the 14th edition of the Tour of Utah. It was rated as a 2.HC on the 2018 UCI America Tour.

Teams
Seventeen teams entered the race. Each team had a maximum of seven riders:

Route

General Classification

Classification leadership

References

External links

2018
2018 UCI America Tour
2018 in American sports
2018 in sports in Utah
August 2018 sports events in the United States